Eristena parvalis is a moth in the family Crambidae. It was described by Frederic Moore in 1877. It is found on the Andamans.

References

Acentropinae
Moths described in 1877